Saddle Hills County is a municipal district situated in the central portion of the Peace Country in northwest Alberta, Canada.

Geography

Communities and localities 
The following urban municipalities are surrounded by Saddle Hills County.
Cities
none
Towns
none
Villages
none
Summer villages
none

The following hamlets are located within Saddle Hills County.
Hamlets
Woking

The following localities are located within Saddle Hills County.
Localities 
Bay Tree
Blueberry Mountain
Bonanza
Braeburn
Cotillion
Dunvegan Settlement
Fourth Creek
Gordondale
Happy Valley
Ksituan
Moonshine Lake
Northmark
Poplar Ridge
Savanna
Silver Valley
Whitburn

Demographics 

In the 2016 Census of Population conducted by Statistics Canada, Saddle Hills County had a population of 2,225 living in 838 of its 978 total private dwellings, a  change from its 2011 population of 2,288.

Economy 
Saddle Hills County is situated in the Central Peace Region of northwestern Alberta along the southern banks of the Peace River. The county has a diverse agricultural community and deposits of natural gas and oil.

The oil and gas industry continues to play an important role in the region and helps to create a progressive and growing economic base.

Saddle Hills County is also home to a diverse agricultural community which produces crops which include: pulses, cereals, canola, legumes as well as bison, elk, goats and sheep. The most common livestock is cattle with an estimated of 26,429 head.

Rail service is available nearby in the Village of Rycroft, the Hamlet of Woking and the City of Dawson Creek.

Two major road corridors (Highway 49 and Highway 2) run through the County offering access to the Northwest Territories, British Columbia as well as Central and Southern Alberta.

Three areas of the County have been targeted for economic growth and have area structure plans that are designed to give landowners, developers and prospective residents a sense of where the County its future potential.

In November 2019, Saddle Hills County Council declared a municipal agricultural disaster following a wet fall and early snow that resulted in many crops remaining unharvested.
 As late October 2019, only 59% of crops had been harvested in the Peace Region.

Government 
County Council is responsible for establishing municipal service levels, approving the annual budget and local taxation levels. Council has seven members and is headed by a reeve. The reeve, currently Alvin Hubert, is the chief elected officer and is elected from within council. It is the reeve's responsibility to chair all council meetings and speak on behalf of council and the community.

Council provides direction to its administration through its chief administrative officer (CAO). The CAO is responsible for the overall administration of the county and for advising and making recommendations to county council on matters concerning the municipality.

Gallery

See also 
List of communities in Alberta
List of municipal districts in Alberta

References

External links 

 
Municipal districts in Alberta